The PDP National Working Committee, also known by its acronym NWC, is the executive committee of the People's Democratic Party in Nigeria. The NWC is composed of 12 members, all of whom are elected to a four-year term at the party's National Convention. The NWC is headed by the chairperson, who also functions as the party's national chair. The NWC has the responsibility for the day-to-day governance of the party as well as oversight of its national activities.

Current NWC leadership
The following is a list of those who comprise the 2021 National Working Committee:
 National Chairman: Iyorchia Ayu
 Deputy National Chairman (North): Umar Iliya Damagum
 Deputy National Chairman (South): Taofeek Arapaja
 National Secretary: Samuel Anyanwu
 National Treasurer: Ahmed Yayari Mohammed
 National Organizing Secretary: Umar Bature
 National Financial: Daniel Woyegikuro
 National Woman Leader: Stella Effah-Attoe
 National Youth Leader: Muhammed Kadade Suleiman
 National Legal Adviser: Kamaldeen Adeyemi Ajibade
 National Publicity Secretary: Debo Ologunagba

 National Auditor: Okechukwu Obiechina Daniel 
 Deputy National Secretary: Setonji Koshoede
 Deputy National Treasurer: Ndubisi Eneh David

NWC chairpersons
The following is a list of chairs of the National Working Committee:

Alex Ekwueme
Solomon Lar 
Barnabas Andyar Gemade 
Audu Ogbeh 
Ahmadu Ali 
Vincent Eze Ogbulafor
Okwesilieze Nwodo 
Haliru Mohammed Bello (Acting)
Kawu Baraje (Acting)
Bamanga Tukur
Adamu Mu'azu
Uche Secondus (Acting)
Ali Modu Sheriff
Ahmed Makarfi (Acting)
Uche Secondus
Iyorchia Ayu

See also
PDP Board of Trustees
PDP Governors Forum
2016 PDP National Convention

References

NWC
Organizations established in 1998
Executive committees of political parties